Blackman Lake is a lake in the U.S. state of Washington.

Blackman Lake was named after the Blackman brothers, businesspeople in the local logging industry.

See also
List of lakes in Washington

References

Lakes of Snohomish County, Washington
Lakes of Washington (state)